Anametalia sternaloides is a species of sea urchin of the family Brissidae. Their armour is covered with spines. It is placed in the genus Anametalia and lives in the sea. Anametalia sternaloides was first scientifically described in 1874 by Bolau.

References 

Brissidae
Animals described in 1874